"I'm on Fire" is a single by the band 5000 Volts. In Germany, the single was released under the group name Airbus (on Epic Records). It peaked at number 5 in Australia and was the 55th biggest selling single in Australia in 1976. and charted in the United States, reaching number 26. It reached number four on the UK Singles Chart, and number one on the German Top 100 Singles chart. "I'm On Fire" was also on the Swedish chart and reached number 10 in South Africa.

The singer Tina Charles provided vocals for the single, but she was not publicly acknowledged because of contractual problems.

It samples Black Is Black (1966) by the band Los Bravos.

Jim Gilstrap version

A version by Jim Gilstrap also entered the charts. For the week ending November 15, 1975, Billboard recorded the single at its fourth week in the Soul charts. It had moved to number 37 from its previous position of 45.  In Holland it peaked at number 21, spending five weeks in the charts there.

References

1975 singles
Philips Records singles
1975 songs
Number-one singles in Germany
Number-one singles in Sweden
Number-one singles in Belgium